Kaya Oakes is an American nonfiction writer and journalist from the San Francisco Bay Area of California.

Biography
She was born in Oakland and earned an MFA in creative writing at Saint Mary's College of California in Moraga. 

Since 1999, Oakes has taught writing at the University of California, Berkeley. She also is a senior correspondent for Religion Dispatches, a contributing writer for America magazine, and has written for The Guardian, Foreign Policy, and On Being.

Her first book, Telegraph, a collection of poetry published in 2007, received the Transcontinental Poetry Prize from Pavement Saw Press in 2008. Her nonfiction book, Slanted and Enchanted: The Evolution of Indie Culture, was published by Henry Holt in June 2009. She is an editor for the religion website Killing the Buddha.

In 2002, she co-founded Kitchen Sink Magazine, which received the Utne Independent Press Award for Best New Magazine in 2003. Oakes edited and wrote for Kitchen Sink until it ended its print run in 2007. She has been the recipient of teaching fellowships from the Mellon Faculty Institute and the Bay Area Writing Project, as well as a writing prize from the Academy of American Poets. Oakes has twice been nominated for the Pushcart Prize in nonfiction.

In her memoir, Radical Reinvention: An Unlikely Return to the Catholic Church, published by Counterpoint in June 2012, Oakes, who had been raised Catholic, recounts how, after years of proudly calling herself an atheist and despite her frustration with Catholic conservatism, she returned to the Catholic faith.

Oakes published her fourth book, The Nones Are Alright: A New Generation of Seekers, Believers, and Those In Between, with Orbis Books in 2015. It was a finalist for the 2015 Religion News Association best book award. The book examines the decline in participation in organized religion in America by profiling individuals who either fell away from or embraced religion.

References

External links
 Kaya Oakes' official website

20th-century American women writers
20th-century American non-fiction writers
21st-century American women writers
Living people
American feminists
American memoirists
American Roman Catholic religious writers
Catholics from California
Converts to Roman Catholicism from atheism or agnosticism
Saint Mary's College of California alumni
University of California, Berkeley faculty
Writers from Oakland, California
American women memoirists
Women religious writers
Year of birth missing (living people)
21st-century American non-fiction writers
American women journalists
Catholic feminists